Leon James is an Indian film composer and singer who works in Tamil and Telugu films. He made his debut by composing two songs for the Tamil film, Kanchana 2 (2015) directed by Raghava Lawrence, before being noticed for his work in Ko 2 (2016).

Early life
Leon James became interested in music as a result of his father Noel James's involvement in the industry as A. R. Rahman's manager, and began piano lessons aged three. He played in a school band called Zinx alongside Anirudh Ravichander, with the pair remaining close friends. He is also currently a part of Project Yuj, a "neo-Carnatic funk" band alongside Aalap Raju, Prakash Hariharan and Jeoraj George and the team released an independent album in November 2014. Prior to making his debut as a composer, Leon has worked as a keyboardist for stage shows and film albums composed by Santhosh Narayanan, Anirudh Ravichander and Thaman.

Career
Leon James made a breakthrough in the Tamil film industry after his work was spotted by Raghava Lawrence, who was working on his horror comedy film Kanchana 2 (2015). Lawrence had heard a romantic melody song composed by Leon on YouTube and wanted it adapted to be used in his film, and subsequently brought the composer on board to work on the film's soundtrack. The song, "Vaayaa En Veera" sung by Shakthisree Gopalan, won positive reviews with Karthik Srinivasan of The Hindu noting that "Leon's music seems very new-agey" and his "sound is fresh, and purposefully cluttered". He later asked Leon to work on a further fast-paced song to be used in the film's climax, and the tune "Sandi Muni" was resultantly produced. The film went on to become amongst the profitable ventures of the year, with Leon's work noticed by critics. Soon after the release of the film in April 2015, he teamed up with singer Andrea Jeremiah to record a song called "Ezhunthu Vaa" to promote female empowerment.

The successful nature of his work in his first album prompted producer Elred Kumar to sign him up to work on the whole album for the political-thriller, Ko 2 (2015). The album of Ko 2 entailed of six tracks, with a promotional song titled "Unnai Maatrinal" released early as a tribute to former Indian President Abdul Kalam, consisting of lyrics based on his speeches. The album featured vocals from Bollywood artistes Vishal Dadlani, Salim Merchant and Neeti Mohan, while Chinmayi and Leon James, himself, also recorded songs. Leon James also chose to introduce Harish Sivaramakrishnan from the Bangalore-based rock band Agam and London-based singer Inno Genga, for their first respective songs in the Tamil film industry.

Discography

As composer

Original soundtrack

Original film score

As vocalist

Non-film songs 
2015 – "Ezhunthu Vaa" (featuring Andrea Jeremiah)
2015 – "Punnagaiyya" (featuring Andrea Jeremiah)
2018 – "Kanne Kanne" (featuring Jonita Gandhi)
2020 - "Unna Vida Maaten" (featuring Andrea Jeremiah)
2020 - "Suzhaluren" (featuring Ko Sesha)
2021 - "Unakaaga Naan Irupen" (featuring Avinash Ashok & Shubhangi Jha)

Film songs

References

External links
 

Loyola College, Chennai alumni
Living people
Musicians from Chennai
Tamil film score composers
1991 births
Indian male film score composers
Telugu film score composers